San Antonio is a municipality in the Honduran department of Copán.

History 
It was founded in 1782 as San Antonio del Descanso.

References 

Municipalities of the Copán Department